The Union Glacier Camp is the only private seasonally occupied  camp site located in Ellsworth Land in Antarctica. The camp is located in the Heritage Range, below the Ellsworth Mountains, on Union Glacier, that gives the camp its name.

Location and features 

The camp is operated by Antarctic Logistics & Expeditions LLC (ALE), a company that provides expedition support and tours to the interior of Antarctica. The camp is situated near Union Glacier Blue-Ice Runway SCGC a rare, naturally occurring, blue ice runway that allows wheeled jet cargo aircraft to land. Russian Ilyushin Il-76 aircraft regularly transport equipment and personnel to the camp. From Union Glacier Camp transportation to the South Pole, Vinson Massif, Hercules Inlet and other locations is by Twin Otter and Basler BT-67 ski planes. Union Glacier Camp replaced the earlier Patriot Hills Base Camp.

During the months of November to January, when the weather is the least hostile, jet charter flights are operated from Punta Arenas, Chile to the camp.  Union Glacier is the site of the annual Antarctic Ice Marathon, as well as the start of the World Marathon Challenge (7 Marathons on 7 continents in 7 days).

See also 
 List of Antarctic research stations
 List of Antarctic field camps

References

External links 
 Adventure Network International ANI

Outposts of Antarctica
Outposts of Ellsworth Land